The K-7 Bridge is an automobile crossing of the Kansas River on the border of Shawnee and Bonner Springs. It was built around 1960, and carries four lanes of K-7.

Bridges over the Kansas River
Road bridges in Kansas
Girder bridges in the United States